The United Kingdom competed at the Eurovision Song Contest 1992 with Michael Ball and the song "One Step Out of Time".

Before Eurovision

Artist selection
The BBC continued to use a national final A Song for Europe to select United Kingdom's entry. For 1992, the multi-artist format utilized since 1976 was dropped in favor of a single artist performing several songs as from 1964 to 1975. Michael Ball was revealed by the BBC as the British entrant for the 1992 Eurovision Song Contest.

A Song for Europe 1992 
Two songs each were premiered during the four broadcasts of Wogan on BBC1 between 8 and 30 March 1992, and were later featured in various programmes on BBC Radio 2. 

Eight songs, all performed by Michael Ball, competed in the televised final on 3 April 1992 held at the BBC's TVC3 Studio in London and hosted by Terry Wogan. The show was broadcast on BBC1 and BBC Radio 2 with commentary by Ken Bruce. The performances were filmed earlier on 2 April 1992 and a public televote selected the winning song, "One Step Out of Time", which was revealed during a separate show broadcast on BBC1 and hosted by Terry Wogan.

Paul Curtis' song was a last minute replacement for an unnamed song that was either disqualified or withdrawn. It was Curtis' 22nd and last song to feature in the UK's Eurovision heats; a record for any song writer. It was the only one of the eight songs that Michael Ball did not record. He released the other five best placed songs on his debut album Michael Ball, which topped the UK album chart in May 1992. The winning song was released by his label Polydor on single in 7" vinyl, cassette and CD formats, reaching no. 20 in the UK singles chart. The remaining two songs were eventually included on various compilation albums.

At Eurovision
Ball performed 16th on the night of the contest, following Austria and preceding Ireland. He received 139 points, placing 2nd in a field of 23. Despite coming second, he received more 12 points than eventual winner Ireland.

Voting

References

External links
UK National Final 1992

1992
Countries in the Eurovision Song Contest 1992
Eurovision
Eurovision